Tota Rani is a small village near Dal Lake in Kangra district, Himachal Pradesh, India. It has a very long history of settlement by  Nepali people.  Thapa and Gurung culture are mixed here and now the Nepali culture almost vanished and people mingle with local Himachali people, Gaddis.

Villages in Kangra district